R. Raghuraj is an Indian film director who has worked on Tamil, Telugu and Kannada language films. After beginning his career in Tamil films, Raghuraj has experienced more success in Telugu and Kannada films.

Career
After beginning his career as a photo journalist, Raghuraj apprenticed as an editor with B. Lenin, before receiving an opportunity from producer K. T. Kunjumon to direct his first feature film, Sakthi (1997). The film, featuring Vineeth and Yuvarani in the lead roles, received negative reviews and performed poorly at the box office. Raghuraj then took a sabbatical before re-emerging with the Telugu film, Kalusukovalani (2002), which became a box office success. This prompted Raghuraj to remake the film as Ice (2003) in Tamil, with newcomer Ashok and Priyanka Trivedi in the lead roles. Comparatively, the Tamil version did not perform as well and critics noted that the film "makes viewers feel restless". In 2004, Raghuraj briefly worked on a project titled Jockey with Prashanth, Laila and Malavika in the lead roles, but the film was later stalled.

In 2009, Raghuraj revealed that he was working on a trilogy of vigilante films and that Appavi would be the first of the three. Prior to release, the film was reported in the media for producing India's largest flag for a sequence, at 1115 feet. The film eventually had a delayed release in 2011. Raghuraj then moved to make films in the Kannada film industry, and has worked on four projects including Boss (2011) and Namaste Madam (2014).

Filmography

References

External links
 

Living people
Tamil film directors
Kannada film directors
Year of birth missing (living people)